Grez-Neuville is a commune in the Maine-et-Loire department in western France.

Geography
The Oudon forms part of the commune's northern border before joining the Mayenne, which flows south through the commune.

See also
Communes of the Maine-et-Loire department

References 

Grezneuville